Ko Gi-Hyun (Hangul: 고기현, Hanja: 高基鉉) (born May 11, 1986) is a South Korean short track speed skater. Ko remains the second youngest individual gold medalist after Tara Lipinski in the history of the Olympic Winter Games, winning gold in women's 1500 m event at the 2002 Winter Olympics in Salt Lake City, United States, at 15 years and 277 days old.

External links

1986 births
Living people
South Korean female speed skaters
South Korean female short track speed skaters
Olympic short track speed skaters of South Korea
Olympic gold medalists for South Korea
Olympic silver medalists for South Korea
Olympic medalists in short track speed skating
Short track speed skaters at the 2002 Winter Olympics
Medalists at the 2002 Winter Olympics
Asian Games medalists in short track speed skating
Asian Games bronze medalists for South Korea
Short track speed skaters at the 2003 Asian Winter Games
Medalists at the 2003 Asian Winter Games
World Short Track Speed Skating Championships medalists
South Korean Buddhists
21st-century South Korean women